The Very Best of Tower of Power: The Warner Years is a compilation album of material recorded by the band Tower of Power from May 1972 to September 1975. Stephen Thomas Erlewine of AllMusic writes in his review that "for listeners that want a lean dose of the TOP's prime, this is the best collection on the market."

Track listing

All track information and credits were taken from the CD liner notes.

References

External links
Tower of Power Official Site
Warner Brothers Records Official Site
Rhino Records Official Site

2001 compilation albums
Tower of Power albums
Warner Records compilation albums
Rhino Records compilation albums